George Wilfred Anthony (1810 – 14 November 1859) was an English landscape painter, art teacher and art critic.

Life
He was born in Manchester, a cousin of Henry Mark Anthony, studied landscape painting under John Ralston (1789–1833), and afterwards under J. V. Barber of Birmingham. He moved to Preston, then Wigan, finally settling in Manchester again as a teacher of art; he also ran a shop selling stationery.  Between 1827 and 1859 he exhibited 60 pictures, mostly watercolour landscapes, at the Royal Manchester Institution (RMI).  He was also an art-critic for the Manchester Guardian, writing under the pseudonym "Gabriel Tinto". He was one of the executors of the will of the local painter Henry Liverseege.

He died in Manchester on 14 November 1859, aged 49.

Notes

References
 

1810 births
1859 deaths
British art teachers
English art critics
English landscape painters
English watercolourists
Artists from Manchester
19th-century British painters
British male painters
19th-century British male writers
19th-century British writers
19th-century British male artists